Sadriddin Ayni (15 April 1878 – 15 July 1954) was a Tajik intellectual who wrote poetry, fiction, journalism, history, and a dictionary. He is regarded  as Tajikistan's national poet and one of the most important writers in the country's history.

Biography 

Ayni was born in a peasant family in the village of Soktare in what was then the Emirate of Bukhara. He became an orphan at 12 and moved to join his older brother in Bukhara, where he attended a madrasa and learned to write in Arabic.

In the early 1920s, Ayni helped to propagate the Russian Revolution in Uzbekistan and Tajikistan. In 1934, he attended the Soviet Congress of Writers as the Tajik representative. By purporting national identity in his writings, he was able to escape the Soviet censors that quieted many intellectuals in Central Asia. Ayni survived the Soviet Purges, and even outlived Stalin by one year. He was member of the Supreme Soviet of Tajikistan for 20 years, was awarded the Order of Lenin three times, and was the first president of the Academy of Sciences of Tajik SSR. After 1992, his writing helped to bind together a sense of Tajik nationalism that survived the collapse of the Soviet Union.

Ayni gave indigenous Tajik literature in Tajikistan a boost in 1927 by writing Dokhunda, the first Tajikistani novel in the Tajik language. In 1934 and 1935, leading Russian director Lev Kuleshov worked for two years in Tajikistan at a movie based on Dokhunda but the project was regarded with suspicion by the authorities as possibly exciting Tajik nationalism, and stopped. No footage survives. Ayni's four-volume Yoddoshtho (Memoirs), completed 1949-54 are famous and widely read. In 1956, Tajik director Boris (Besion) Kimyagarov (1920–1979) was finally able to get approval for a movie version of Dokhunda.

Ayni's early poems were about love and nature, but after the national awakening in Tajikistan, his subject matter shifted to the dawn of the new age and the working class. His writings often criticized the Amir of Bukhara. Two well-known are The Slave and The Bukhara Executioners.

Ayni died in Dushanbe, the capital of Tajikistan, where a mausoleum stands in his honor.

References

Notes

Translations
Ainī, Sadriddin, and John R. Perry. 1998. The sands of Oxus: boyhood reminiscences of Sadriddin Aini. Costa Mesa, Calif: Mazda Publishers.

External links

Sadriddin Ayni's timeline, biography and names of works 

1878 births
1954 deaths
20th-century male writers
20th-century Tajikistani historians
People from Bukhara Region
Members of the Tajik Academy of Sciences
Stalin Prize winners
Recipients of the Order of Lenin
Recipients of the Order of the Red Banner of Labour
Male poets
20th-century Tajikistani poets
Tajikistani male writers
Persian-language poets
Tajikistani novelists
Tajikistani journalists
Tajik poets
Socialist realism writers
Soviet poets
Soviet male writers
Soviet politicians
Communist Party of Tajikistan politicians
Third convocation members of the Supreme Soviet of the Soviet Union
Fourth convocation members of the Supreme Soviet of the Soviet Union
Jadids
Researchers of Persian literature
19th-century pseudonymous writers
20th-century pseudonymous writers
People from the Emirate of Bukhara